Green Bay Packaging is an American pulp and paper company based in Green Bay, Wisconsin. They produce corrugated shipping containers, folding cartons, and coated label products.

History
The Green Bay Box Company was formed in 1933 by George F. Kress. They began by manufacturing corrugated shipping boxes.

In 1961, Jim Kress became president of Green Bay Box Company.

In 1963, Green Bay Box Company merged with Green Bay Pulp & Paper to become Green Bay Packaging.

In 1964, the company opened a factory in Wausau, Wisconsin.

In 1965, the company opened a factory in Fremont, Ohio.

In 1970, Green Bay Packaging became the first company to develop and execute a closed water process.

In 1992, Green Bay Packaging became one of the first companies to become effluent free.

In 1995, Will Kress became president of Green Bay Packaging.

In 1996, founder George F. Kress was inducted into the Paper Industry International Hall of Fame, as was former president Jim Kress in 2005.

In 2014, the company acquired Midland Packaging and Display of Franksville, Wisconsin and Great Lakes Packaging Corporation of Germantown, Wisconsin.

In 2015, the company acquired Baird Display of Waukesha, Wisconsin.

In 2018, the company acquires Wisconsin Packaging Corporation Fort Atkinson, Wisconsin, Grand Traverse Container, Inc and Citadel Industries. The Green Bay Mill Division breaks ground on state-of-the-art paper mill. The Chicago Sales & Distribution Center broke ground for the construction of a new 170,000 square-foot complex in Downers Grove, IL.

Awards
In 1973, the National Sports Foundation awarded Green Bay Packaging their National Gold Medal for their efforts in water pollution abatement.

In 1994, they were recognized as a Wisconsin Business Friend of the Environment.

In 2004, they were awarded the Wisconsin Governor's Award for Excellence in environmental performance, as well as the Tag and Label Manufacturer's Institute Environmental Award for Innovative Technology.

In 2005, they received the Brown County Business Recycling and Waste Minimization Award.

References

External links
Official website

Companies based in Green Bay, Wisconsin
Manufacturing companies based in Wisconsin
Pulp and paper companies of the United States
Manufacturing companies established in 1933
1933 establishments in Wisconsin